Raincliffe may refer to:

Raincliffe School
Raincliffe Woods